Alto Pass is a village in Union County, Illinois, United States. The population was 391 at the 2010 census, an increase from 388 in 2000. The Bald Knob Cross and Bald Knob Wilderness are nearby. Alto Pass lies roughly 5.1 miles to the northwest of downtown Cobden, Illinois.

History
Alto Pass was originally called Quetil, and under the latter name was laid out in 1875 when the railroad was extended to that point.

Geography
Alto Pass is located at  (37.569758, -89.318873).

Bald Knob Cross is located approximately five miles southwest of the village.

Demographics

As of the census of 2000, there were 388 people, 159 households, and 111 families residing in the village. The racial makeup of the village was 87.11% White, 0.77% Native American, 10.57% from other races, and 1.55% from two or more races. Hispanic or Latino of any race were 15.21% of the population.

There were 159 households, out of which 25.8% had children under the age of 18 living with them, 59.7% were married couples living together, 6.3% had a female householder with no husband present, and 29.6% were non-families. 27.7% of all households were made up of individuals, and 10.7% had someone living alone who was 65 years of age or older. The average household size was 2.44 and the average family size was 3.00.

In the village, the population was spread out, with 22.4% under the age of 18, 8.8% from 18 to 24, 27.3% from 25 to 44, 26.8% from 45 to 64, and 14.7% who were 65 years of age or older. The median age was 40 years. For every 100 females, there were 103.1 males. For every 100 females age 18 and over, there were 104.8 males.

The median income for a household in the village was $33,500, and the median income for a family was $36,406. Males had a median income of $25,583 versus $19,000 for females. The per capita income for the village was $17,288. About 12.0% of families and 15.3% of the population were below the poverty line, including 20.7% of those under age 18 and 6.7% of those age 65 or over.

References

External links
 Alto Pass, IL Community Profile

Villages in Union County, Illinois
Villages in Illinois